"Everything That Touches You" is a song written by Terry Kirkman and originally released in 1968 by the American sunshine pop band the Association.

In the U.S., the song reached number 10 on the Billboard Hot 100 chart, number 22 on the Billboard Easy Listening chart and number 11 on the Cash Box Top 100 chart.

In Canada, the song reached number 6 on the RPM Top Singles chart.

Chart performance

Weekly charts

References

1968 songs
1968 singles
The Association songs
Song recordings produced by Bones Howe
Songs written by Terry Kirkman
Warner Records singles